Sjónvarp Símans, formerly SkjárEinn (ScreenOne), is an Icelandic television channel owned by Síminn.

Sjónvarp Símans broadcasts both Icelandic and foreign television shows. Since its foundation in 1999 it has aired crime, drama, reality and comedy television series. It is distributed by analogue over-the-air broadcast signal and also digitally via Síminn and Vodafone IPTV and Vodafone Digital Ísland.

Sjónvarp Símans used to be free to anyone living in Iceland but switched to a premium subscription channel in 2009. In 2015, after Skipti, the former parent company of Síminn and Skjárinn, merged with Síminn, the channel switched to a mixed subscription model. Watching the linear broadcast is free but a subscription option called Sjónvarp Símans Premium offers more content then the linear broadcast, such as a library of old shows and series, shows what have not been aired in the linear broadcast, movies and more. On 1 June 2016, the channel's name was changed from SkjárEinn to Sjónvarp Símans, to reflect the revolution the channel and Síminn itself had been through since the merger of Síminn and its sister companies.

National productions made for SkjárEinn/Sjónvarp Símans
 6 til sjö
 Allt í drasli (2005–2008, adaptation of How Clean is Your House?)
 Djúpa laugin
 The Voice Ísland
 Dýravinir
 Ertu skarpari en skólakrakki?
 Frægir í form
 Fyndnar fjölskyldumyndir (2009)
 GameTíví (2008–2014)
 Gegndrepa
 Innlit/útlit (2009)
 Johnny International
 Matarklúbburinn (2009)
 Nýtt útlit (2009)
 Sigtið
 Sjáumst með Silvíu Nótt
 Spjallið með Sölva (2009)
 Ha? (2011)

See also
 RÚV
 Stöð 2

References

External links
 

Television channels in Iceland
Television channels and stations established in 1999
Companies based in Reykjavík
1999 establishments in Iceland